Lithops marmorata is a species of succulent pebble plant. It is native to Southern Africa. The specific name is derived from the Latin word marmorata meaning "marbled."

Description 
It is a succulent perennial that grows in a clumping formation. Its leaves are enormously bulbous and are usually a grey to light green color, with a marbled pattern on the top. The flower is much like a daisy, and sprouts from between each pair of leaves.

References

marmorata
Perennial plants
Taxa named by N. E. Brown